Grodzisko  is a village in the administrative district of Gmina Biała Piska, within Pisz County, Warmian-Masurian Voivodeship, in northern Poland.

Located right on the prewar (East Prussian) - (Polish border), which was demarcated by the Johannes Fluss (river).

References

Grodzisko